National Route 166 is a national highway of Japan connecting Habikino, Osaka and Matsusaka, Mie in Japan, with a total length of 125.4 km (77.92 mi).

References

166
Roads in Mie Prefecture
Roads in Nara Prefecture
Roads in Osaka Prefecture